La Aguilera is a small Spanish village about 7 km from Aranda de Duero in the province of Burgos. Wine cellars and "merenderos" (personal BBQ areas) built into the side of a hill overlook the village. It is located in the grape-growing region of the Ribera del Duero wine region.

Municipalities in the Province of Burgos